Rui Pedro dos Santos Patrício  (born 15 February 1988) is a Portuguese professional footballer who plays as a goalkeeper for Serie A team Roma and the Portugal national team. He is often nicknamed "São Patrício" (Saint Patrício) for his saves for club and country.

A product of Sporting CP's youth academy, Patricio made his first team debut at the age of 18, and went on to appear in 467 official games. He won five trophies during his 12 years with the club, including two Portuguese Cups, before moving to England to join Wolverhampton Wanderers in 2018. In 2021, he signed for Roma, where he won the Europa Conference League in his first season.

Patrício earned his first cap for Portugal in 2010, after Paulo Bento's appointment as head coach, and his 100th in 2021. He represented the nation in three World Cups and four European Championships, winning the 2016 edition of the latter tournament as well as the 2019 Nations League.

Club career

Sporting
Born in the village of Marrazes in Leiria, Patrício played as a striker at a young age. Reportedly, a Sporting CP scout was in the area and saw him play in goal, being impressed enough to sign the 12-year-old to the club's youth academy. He made his Primeira Liga debut on 19 November 2006, in a 1–0 away win against C.S. Marítimo in the tenth round: standing in for habitual club and country first-choice Ricardo, he saved a penalty kick 15 minutes before the end of the game.

In the 2007–08 season, after Ricardo's departure to Real Betis, Patrício beat competition from Sporting veteran Tiago and new signing Vladimir Stojković to become the undisputed starter. He made his UEFA Champions League debut on 27 November 2007, in a 1–2 group stage loss at Manchester United.

During the 2008 off-season, Patrício was the subject of a rumoured transfer to Italian giants Inter Milan. Nothing came of it, however, and in that year's Supertaça Cândido de Oliveira, against FC Porto, he stopped a Lucho González penalty in a 2–0 final success, also being an everpresent fixture in the league.

In the qualifying rounds of the 2009–10 Champions League, at FC Twente, Sporting were trailing 0–1 in the 94th minute, after a 0–0 tie in the first leg: Patrício rushed to the opposing area for a corner kick, where he went up for a header with Nikita Rukavytsya. Both players seemed to make contact with the ball, and it was helped into the net for an own goal via the boot of Peter Wisgerhof as the latter side qualified for the last games prior to the group stage.

On 20 December 2012, Patrício was awarded Sporting's Footballer of the Year award for a second consecutive year. On 18 October 2014, with the score at 2–1 for his team, he saved a penalty by Jackson Martínez to help oust Porto from the Taça de Portugal with a 3–1 win at the Estádio do Dragão.

Patrício was one of 30 players nominated for the 2016 Ballon d'Or award alongside Portugal teammates Pepe and Cristiano Ronaldo. On 18 February the following year he appeared in his 400th competitive game with Sporting, putting on a Player of the match performance in a 1–0 home win against Rio Ave FC.

On 15 May 2018, Patrício and several of his teammates, including coaches, were injured following an attack by around 50 supporters of Sporting at the club's training ground after the team finished third in the league and missed out on Champions League qualification. Despite the events, he and the rest of the team agreed to play in the Portuguese Cup final scheduled for the following weekend, eventually losing 2–1 to C.D. Aves.

Patrício's record of 467 official games was the second-highest in Sporting's history, behind only Hilário da Conceição.

Wolverhampton Wanderers
On 1 June 2018, Patrício submitted a request to terminate his Sporting contract with grounds for just cause, due to the dressing room violence from supporters as well as seeing an €18 million move to newly promoted Premier League team Wolverhampton Wanderers fall through, after Sporting president Bruno de Carvalho pulled out of negotiations at the last minute. He completed the move on 18 June, on a four-year deal, and it was announced on 31 October that both clubs had agreed a €18 million deal as settlement of his departure to England.

Patrício opted to wear the No.11 shirt for Wolves as opposed to the habitual No.1, in honour of Carl Ikeme, who had just retired following treatment for acute leukaemia. He made his league debut on 11 August 2018, in a 2–2 home draw against Everton. He kept nine clean sheets – a club record – as they finished his first season in seventh place and qualified for the Europa League.

In 2019–20, Patrício increased his number of clean sheets to 13, and conceded 40 goals compared to 46 the season before. On the European front, he helped the team to a first continental quarter-final since 1972. On 19 February 2021, he played his 100th Premier League match in a 1–0 win over Leeds United.

Roma

On 13 July 2021, Patrício joined Italian side A.S. Roma, signing a three-year deal. He made his debut on 19 August in the first game under compatriot José Mourinho, a 2–1 win away to Trabzonspor in the first leg of the UEFA Europa Conference League playoffs. Three days later he made his first Serie A appearance, a 3–1 victory at home to ACF Fiorentina; he was one of seven players to feature in every game of the season while only Empoli F.C. counterpart Guglielmo Vicario matched him for playing every minute. He played all bar one of the 15 fixtures as the team won the inaugural Conference League, including the 1–0 final win over Feyenoord in Tirana.

International career

From 2007, Patrício started appearing for the Portuguese under-21 side. On 29 January of the following year, senior team coach Luiz Felipe Scolari called him up for a 1–3 friendly defeat against Italy in Zürich, although he did not leave the bench; on 12 May he was picked to the squad for UEFA Euro 2008, but did not play in the tournament.

Although not part of the provisional 24-player list for the 2010 FIFA World Cup in South Africa, Patrício was named in a backup list of six players. He made his debut on 17 November 2010, playing the second half of a 4–0 friendly win against Spain.

After Eduardo was relegated to the bench at his new club, S.L. Benfica, Patrício became the starter under national team boss Paulo Bento, and both players finished the Euro 2012 qualifying campaign with five games (450 minutes) as Portugal qualified for the final stages. He was the starter in the finals in Poland and Ukraine, conceding four goals in five matches in an eventual semi-final exit.

Patrício was included in Bento's 23-man squad for the 2014 FIFA World Cup as first-choice, and made his debut in the competition in the first encounter against Germany, which ended with a 0–4 loss. He missed the second game against the United States, due to injury.

Patrício appeared in his 50th international on 30 June 2016, during Euro 2016: after the 1–1 draw to Poland at the Stade Vélodrome during the first 120 minutes, he saved Jakub Błaszczykowski's attempt in a 5–3 penalty shootout win that qualified to the semi-finals. Having won the tournament with a solid display in the final, he also made the squad for the 2018 FIFA World Cup in Russia. On 17 November that year, he captained the side for the first time in a goalless draw with Italy in the UEFA Nations League.

As Portugal defeated the Netherlands in the 2019 UEFA Nations League Final on home soil at the Estádio do Dragão, Patrício earned his 81st cap, thereby surpassing Vítor Baía as the nation's most capped goalkeeper. After keeping his place at the delayed UEFA Euro 2020 in 2021, he reached 100 caps on 12 October that year in a 5–0 World Cup qualifying win over Luxembourg, becoming the seventh Portuguese and first goalkeeper to the landmark. 

In March 2022, Patrício did not play in the World Cup playoffs, being replaced by Porto's Diogo Costa. At the finals in Qatar, the latter played all five matches in a run to the quarter-finals.

Personal life
Patrício married Joana Pereira in June 2011, after a seven-year relationship. He filed for divorce on 24 December of the same year, aged 23. As of 2019, he is married to television sexologist Vera Ribeiro, with whom he has a son and a daughter.

Career statistics

Club

International

Honours

Sporting
Taça de Portugal: 2006–07, 2007–08, 2014–15
Taça da Liga: 2017–18
Supertaça Cândido de Oliveira: 2007, 2008, 2015

Roma
UEFA Europa Conference League: 2021–22
Portugal
UEFA European Championship: 2016
UEFA Nations League: 2018–19
Individual
SJPF Young Player of the Month: January 2008, April 2009, November 2010, March 2011, April 2011
SJPF Player of the Month: April 2011
Sporting CP Footballer of the Year: 2011, 2012
LPFP Primeira Liga Goalkeeper of the Year: 2011–12, 2015–16
UEFA European Championship Team of the Tournament: 2016
O Jogo Primeira Liga Team of the Year: 2017
SJPF Primeira Liga Team of the Year: 2017
UEFA Europa League Squad of the Season: 2017–18
 UEFA Europa Conference League Team of the Season: 2021–22
Orders
 Commander of the Order of Merit

Notes

References

External links

Profile at the A.S. Roma website

1988 births
Living people
People from Leiria
Portuguese footballers
Association football goalkeepers
Sporting CP footballers
Wolverhampton Wanderers F.C. players
A.S. Roma players
Primeira Liga players
Premier League players
Serie A players
Portugal youth international footballers
Portugal under-21 international footballers
Portugal international footballers
UEFA Euro 2008 players
UEFA Euro 2012 players
2014 FIFA World Cup players
UEFA Euro 2016 players
2017 FIFA Confederations Cup players
2018 FIFA World Cup players
UEFA Euro 2020 players
2022 FIFA World Cup players
UEFA European Championship-winning players
UEFA Nations League-winning players
FIFA Century Club
Portuguese expatriate footballers
Portuguese expatriate sportspeople in England
Expatriate footballers in England
Portuguese expatriate sportspeople in Italy
Expatriate footballers in Italy
Commanders of the Order of Merit (Portugal)
Sportspeople from Leiria District
UEFA Europa Conference League winning players